Philip MacDonald (5 November 1900 – 10 December 1980) was a British-born writer of fiction and screenplays, best known for thrillers.

Life and work
MacDonald was born in London, the son of author Ronald MacDonald and actress Constance Robertson, and grandson of the fiction writer and Christian minister George MacDonald. During World War I he served with the British cavalry in Mesopotamia, later trained horses for the army, and was a show jumper. He also raised Great Danes. After marrying the writer F. Ruth Howard, he moved to Hollywood in 1931. He was one of the most popular mystery writers of the 1930s, and between 1931 and 1963 wrote many screenplays along with a few radio and television scripts.

His detective novels, particularly those featuring his series detective
Anthony Gethryn, are primarily "whodunits" with the occasional locked room mystery.  His novel X v. Rex (1933), aka The Mystery of The Dead Police, is an early example of what has become known as a serial killer novel (before the term "serial killer" was coined), in which an insane murderer is killing police officers one after the other.  Perhaps his best-known novel is The List of Adrian Messenger.

His work in screenwriting included not only screenplays based on his own works (such as The Mystery of Mr. X in 1934, Who Killed John Savage? in 1937, based on The Rynox Mystery, and many others) but also original stories and screenplays for series characters such as Charlie Chan (Charlie Chan in London, 1934, and Charlie Chan in Paris, 1935) and Mr. Moto (Mysterious Mr. Moto in 1938, Mr. Moto's Last Warning and Mr. Moto Takes a Vacation in 1939).  
He did not receive any screen credit for his work in adapting Bride of Frankenstein.  He adapted a story written by Agatha Christie for the movie Love From A Stranger (1947).  MacDonald and Michael Hogan adapted the novel Rebecca by Daphne du Maurier, from which Robert E. Sherwood and Joan Harrison created the screenplay for Rebecca, the 1940 film.  Sherwood and Harrison were nominated for an Academy Award.

MacDonald's 1927 novel Patrol was issued as one of the first twenty Penguin Books in 1935.  He won the annual Short Story Edgar Award twice, in 1953 for the collection Something to Hide and Other Stories (published in the UK as Fingers of Fear and Other Stories) and in 1956 for the individual short story "Dream No More". He also wrote television scripts for Alfred Hitchcock Presents ("Malice Domestic", 1957) and Perry Mason ("The Case of the Terrified Typist", 1958).

As "W.J. Stuart", MacDonald wrote the novelisation of the 1956 science fiction film Forbidden Planet. He also dabbled in science fiction under his own name, writing at least four SF short stories over a span of decades. Two of them are frequently issued in anthologies ("Our Feathered Friends", 1931, and "Private – Keep Out!", 1949).

MacDonald died in Woodland Hills, California.

A critical essay on MacDonald's crime novels appears in S. T. Joshi's book Varieties of Crime Fiction (Wildside Press, 2019) .

Bibliography of works by Philip MacDonald

Some sources list The Singing Scorpion as a title by MacDonald; in fact, this novel was written by a different writer, Allan Colt MacDonald.
The Rasp (1924). Serialised in American newspapers
Queen's Mate (1926)
Patrol (a.k.a. The Lost Patrol) (1927)
The White Crow (1928)
Likeness of Exe (1929)
The Noose (1930). Serialised, Manchester Evening News (1930)
The Link (1930)
Rynox (1930) (a.k.a. The Rynox Murder Mystery, The Rynox Mystery, The Rynox Murder)
The Choice (a.k.a. The Polferry Mystery and The Polferry Riddle) (1931)
The Crime Conductor (1931)
Murder Gone Mad (1931)
The Wraith (1931)
The Maze (a.k.a. Persons Unknown) (1932)
Rope to Spare (1932)
Death on My Left (1933)
R.I.P. (a.k.a. Menace) (1933)
Glitter (1934)
The Nursemaid Who Disappeared (a.k.a. Warrant for X) (1938)
The Dark Wheel (a.k.a. Sweet and Deadly) with A. Boyd Correll (1948)
Something to Hide (a.k.a. Fingers of Fear) (1952)
The Man out of the Rain (1955)
Guest in the House (a.k.a. No Time for Terror) (1955)
The List of Adrian Messenger (1959). Serialised in American newspapers as Murder Seed. The novel has many points of similarity with Macdonald's screenplay for the film Circle of Danger
Death & Chicanery (1962)

As Oliver Fleming
Ambrotox and Limping Dick (1920), with Ronald MacDonald
The Spandau Quid (1923), with Ronald MacDonald

As Anthony Lawless
Harbour (1931)
Moonfisher (1931)

As Martin Porlock
Mystery at Friar's Pardon (1931)
Mystery in Kensington Gore (1932) (a.k.a. Escape)
X v. Rex (1933) (a.k.a. The Mystery of Mr. X and Mystery of the Dead Police). Serialised in American newspapers as 'Who Killed C*ck Robin Hoode?’. (Later republished as Mystery of the Dead Police by Philip MacDonald as Pocket Books #70, 1940)

As W. J. Stuart
Forbidden Planet (1956, novelization of film)

As Warren Stuart
The Sword and the Net (1941)

Film scripts by Macdonald

1934 – Charlie Chan in London
19?? – Charlie Chan in Paris
1932 – Hotel Splendide. Written with Ralph Smart
1933 – Star Reporter
1934 – The Mystery of Mr X
1935 – The Last Outpost
1936 – Yours for the Asking. Written with Eve Green and Harlan Ware, directed by Alexander Hall
1938 – Mysterious Mr Moto, directed by Norman Foster
1939 – Mr Moto's Last Warning, directed by Norman Foster
1939 – Blind Alley, directed by Charles Vidor
1939 – Mr Moto Takes a Vacation, written with Norman Foster, directed by Norman Foster
1942 – Nightmare
1945 – The Body Snatcher, written with Val Lewton (as Carlos Keith), directed by Robert Wise
1947 – Love from a Stranger, directed by Richard Whorf
1948 – The Dark Past, written with Michael Blankfort and Albert Duffy, directed by Rudolph Mate
1948 – Kiss the Blood Off My Hands, uncredited, adapted from a Gerald Butler novel, screenplay with Leonardo Bercovici
1951 – Circle of Danger, directed by Jacques Tourneur

Films based on works by MacDonald
1929 – Lost Patrol (the novel Patrol), directed by Walter Summers
1932 – The Rasp, directed by Michael Powell
1932 – Rynox, directed by Michael Powell
1934 – The Lost Patrol (the novel Patrol), directed by John Ford
1934 – The Mystery of Mr. X (the novel X v. Rex), directed by Edgar Selwyn
1934 – Menace, originally to be titled Deep Night (the novel of the same name), directed by Ralph Murphy
1936 – The Princess Comes Across, directed by William K Howard
1937 – Who Killed John Savage? (the novel Rynox), directed by Maurice Elvey
1939 – A Gentleman's Gentleman (the play), directed by Roy William Neill
1939 – The Nursemaid Who Disappeared (the novel Warrant for X), directed by Arthur B. Woods
1940 – Hangman's Noose (the novel Rope to Spare), directed by Léon Mathot
1942 – Nightmare, directed by Tim Whelan
1942 – Whispering Ghosts, directed by Alfred Werker
1943 – Sahara, directed by Zoltan Korda
1944 – Action in Arabia, directed by Leonard Mingus
1945 – Dangerous Intruder, directed by Vernon Keays
1952 – The Hour of 13 (the novel X v. Rex), directed by Harold French
1956 – 23 Paces to Baker Street (the novel Warrant for X), directed by Henry Hathaway
1963 – The List of Adrian Messenger, directed by John Huston

References

External links

 
 

1900 births
1980 deaths
English crime fiction writers
English thriller writers
English people of Scottish descent
Edgar Award winners
20th-century English novelists
British military personnel of World War I